Lincoln Trail State Park is a  Illinois state park located in Clark County, Illinois. The state acquired the first  of the park in 1936;  the park and lake were officially dedicated in 1958.

Facilities and amenities
The main attraction of the park is the  Lincoln Trail Lake, which was the third lake created in Illinois (1955-1956) using federal monies under the Dingell-Johnson Act.

The park offers camping, hiking, fishing and boating (outboard motors are limited to ).  Facilities include a launching ramp, parking for boat trailers and a full-service concession stand. Boat and seasonal dock rentals are available.

References

Protected areas of Clark County, Illinois
State parks of Illinois
Protected areas established in 1958
1958 establishments in Illinois